On March 18, 2013, a suicide attack was committed against Christian civilians at the Kano bus station, all of whom were boarding the buses to go to the mostly Christian south.

The attack
On March 18, a Volkswagen Golf packed with explosives and driven by three suicide bombers sped to five buses, which were being boarded by civilians, mostly Christians, to east and south Nigeria. The car hit one of the buses and exploded. After the explosion, people started evacuating from the remaining buses. A fire spread to the four remaining buses, many of which still had passengers in them.

Casualties
It is speculated how many people died in the attack. Sources like the Vanguard claim the attack killed up to 60 people. BBC claims it was 22, though according to Reuters, the number is 25. Though the target of the attacks is not disputed, the buses were carrying mostly Christians, the main target of Boko Haram.

See also
Boko Haram insurgency
January 2012 Northern Nigeria attacks

References

Terrorist incidents in Nigeria in 2013
Suicide car and truck bombings in Nigeria
History of transport in Nigeria
March 2013 events in Africa
2013 murders in Nigeria
Bus bombings in Africa
21st century in Kano
Mass murder in 2013
Transport in Kano
Crime in Kano